The 2019 Kwun Tong District Council election was held on 24 November 2019 to elect all 40 members to the Kwun Tong District Council.

Overall election results
Before election:

Change in composition:

References

External links
 Election Results - Overall Results

2019 Hong Kong local elections